Bausman, Pennsylvania is an unincorporated community in Lancaster Township in Lancaster County, Pennsylvania, United States.

References

Unincorporated communities in Lancaster County, Pennsylvania
Unincorporated communities in Pennsylvania